Space NK is a British retailer of personal care and beauty products.

The company was founded in 1991 by Nicky Kinnaird, with the first store opening in Covent Garden in 1993. Space NK became a Manzanita company in 2002, and as of August 2021, the brand has 76 stores across the UK and Ireland.

In 2020, Space NK repositioned its US business into Wholesale+; a fully serviced wholesale model offering prestige skin, hair and make-up brands across over 50 Nordstrom and Bloomingdale's stores. In August 2021, Space NK launched in Canada with HBC on line and in selected stores.

Space NK offers a range of products, including skincare, cosmetics and gadgets. This selection comprises over 130 brands including Drunk Elephant, Nars, Charlotte Tilbury and Diptyque as well as a host of exclusive brands such as Boy Smells and Rose Inc.

The registered office is Fifth Floor, Shropshire House, 11 – 20 Capper Street, London, WC1E 6JA and its company number is 2773985.

References

External links
UK Official Website
US Official Website
EU Official Website
CN Official Website
Space NK Customer Service

Cosmetics brands
Cosmetics companies of the United Kingdom
Retail companies established in 1993
Retail companies of the United Kingdom